Hillgreen-Lane was a builder of church and theater pipe organs. The company's shop was in Alliance, Ohio, and very close to the shops of the pipe maker A.R. Schopp's Sons, often doing business with them.

Examples

Unity Lutheran Church
One of the company's organs was installed in Unity Lutheran Church in Cleveland, Ohio, and dedicated on Sunday, September 24, 1967, and still graces its worship. Unity's instrument is the 1275th instrument built by Hillgreen-Lane since its establishment in 1898. The organ has two manuals (keyboards) and a pedal keyboard. The tonal resources of the organ come from twenty-one ranks, or rows, of pipes. Each rank has its particular tonality and is brought into use at the discretion of the organist by the arrangement of the stop tablets at the console.

Odeon-Carlton Theatre
One Hillgreen-Lane organ that has been in the news over the past few years is the three-manual instrument with perhaps 19 ranks originally installed in the Odeon-Carlton Theatre in Toronto, Ontario. Upon removal, it was placed in the recreation complex at Queen's University in Kingston, Ontario under the terms of gift, but it was seldom used. American theatre-organist Jim Riggs made a brief video-recording of this instrument. Latterly, the organ was sold to a party in the London, Ontario area  and removed for use in a converted theatre in London Ontario and is in storage. The owner ran into financial difficulty and the instrument was sold, and is presently (2017) owned by Gordon Mcleod of Toronto, and is looking for a new home.

References

Pipe organ building companies
Companies based in Ohio
Musical instrument manufacturing companies of the United States